Newburg Township may refer to:

 Newburg Township, Izard County, Arkansas, in Izard County, Arkansas
 Newburg Township, Pike County, Illinois
 Newburg Township, Mitchell County, Iowa
 Newburg Township, Fillmore County, Minnesota

See also
 Newberg Township, Michigan
 Newburgh Township, Cuyahoga County, Ohio

Township name disambiguation pages